Mike Westhoff (born January 10, 1948) is an American football coach who is the assistant head coach for the Denver Broncos of the National Football League (NFL). Previously, he coached Special Teams for a number of teams, most notably for the New York Jets and Miami Dolphins. Westhoff is considered to be among the greatest special teams coaches in league history.

Coaching career

Miami Dolphins
Westhoff was the special teams / tight ends coach for the Dolphins from 1986 - 2000.

New York Jets
Westhoff joined the Jets staff in 2001 after spending the previous 15 seasons in a similar capacity with the Miami Dolphins.

He stepped down as the special teams coach for the New York Jets in December 2007 after the final game. On September 1, 2008, it was announced Westhoff would return to the Jets' sideline for the 2008 season in an undefined role.

On August 8, 2010, Westhoff received a one-year contract extension. Westhoff remained with the team through 2011, which he announced would likely be his final year with the team. However, on January 26, 2012, the Jets announced that they had given Westhoff a contract extension through the 2012 season. Westhoff officially retired after the 2012 season.

New Orleans Saints
On November 15, 2017 the New Orleans Saints had hired Westhoff to join their special teams coaching staff for the remainder of the 2017 season.  The next day, Saints head coach Sean Payton said that Westhoff would be responsible for supervising all the special teams units.

Following the controversial loss in the 2018 NFC Championship game versus the Los Angeles Rams, Westoff appeared on Mike's On radio show with Mike Francesa of WFAN. On the program, he declared the result of that game as "the toughest loss of his long career".

Denver Broncos
Westhoff was hired to be the assistant head coach of the Denver Broncos under new head coach, Sean Payton, on February 25, 2023.

Personal life
In 1988, Westhoff was diagnosed with cancer of the femur in his left leg. Originally, the condition was misdiagnosed and Westhoff was nearly fatally wounded after the doctor accidentally cut one of his arteries. Once the correct diagnosis was made Westhoff underwent ten surgeries to remove the cancer and the bone replacing it with bone grafts, plates, screws and pins. A cracked bone graft in 2007, caused Westhoff to announce his departure from the Jets. In 2008, Westhoff entered the Memorial Sloan-Kettering Cancer Center to undergo a procedure to replace the missing femur with a titanium rod. After vigorous rehabilitation, Westhoff was able to walk again and returned to the Jets' sidelines in September 2008.

Westhoff is a native of the Pittsburgh suburb of Bethel Park, Pennsylvania. Westhoff has a son, John.

References

Bibliography

External links
New York Jets bio

Living people
Miami Dolphins coaches
New York Jets coaches
People from Bethel Park, Pennsylvania
1948 births